Sabine Jünger (born 21 May 1973, in Königs Wusterhausen) is a German politician for The Left Party.PDS.

Jünger studied theology and changed to legal science in Berlin in 1992. She started political work in 1991, while still in school. In 1992, Jünger became a member of The Left Party.PDS. In 1994, she was elected to the parliament of Mecklenburg-Vorpommern.  In the federal elections in 1998 she was elected to the Bundestag, where she was a member until 2002.

Jünger is openly lesbian and has one child. She is an atheist.

Notes 

1973 births
Living people
People from Königs Wusterhausen
People from Bezirk Potsdam
German atheists
Party of Democratic Socialism (Germany) politicians
Members of the Bundestag for Mecklenburg-Western Pomerania
Members of the Bundestag 1998–2002
Members of the Landtag of Mecklenburg-Western Pomerania
Lesbian politicians
LGBT members of the Bundestag
Female members of the Bundestag
21st-century German women politicians
Members of the Bundestag for The Left
20th-century German women